Franklin Johnson may refer to:

Franklin Johnson (Wisconsin politician) (1849–1935), member of the Wisconsin State Assembly
Franklin W. Johnson (1870–1956), president of Colby College
Franklin Pitcher Johnson Jr., American venture capitalist
Pitch Johnson (1901–1967), born Franklin Pitcher Johnson, American track and field athlete
Franklin Johnson, author of Fallacies of the Higher Criticism in the fundamentalist Christian text The Fundamentals

See also
Frank Johnson (disambiguation)